Kati Kovács (born Katalin Anna Sarolta Kovács 25 October 1944), is a Ferenc Liszt and Kossuth Award-winning Hungarian pop-rock singer, performer, lyricist and actress.

She is one of the most famous singers of Hungary with dozens of recorded albums, awards and presentations in Hungary and abroad, and with international recognition and a very active career until today.

Kovacs is known for her raspy and very strong mezzo-soprano singing voice which received wide praise from Hungarian music critics who have called her: "The Best Female Voice of Hungary". She can sing opera, rock, jazz, pop, dance, blues and rock and roll.

Career

She appeared first time on stage in 1962. She became the first famous nationally in 1965 when she won the seminal TV talent show in Hungary "Ki mit tud?". A year later, she achieved some even greater successes with her performance of the song I Won't Be Your Plaything (Nem leszek a játékszered) which won the TV Dance Song Festivals in Hungary in 1966.

In 1968 she played the leading roles in some films, for example The Girl.

The psychedelic spiritual Lord Send Us Rain (Add már, uram, az esőt!) won the Hungarian Dance Song Festival and the German Song Contest in 1972.

She worked with the Hungarian rock band Locomotiv GT on three albums (Kovács Kati & Locomotiv GT, Közel a naphoz and Kati) and a compilation (Rock and Roller).

In 1974 she won the Castlebar Song Contest in Ireland with the song Roses Are Red, Violets Are Blue (Nálad lenni újra jó lenne).

She appeared as a singer in the 1977 Hungarian film Ök ketten (Women), which was directed by Márta Mészáros.

Since 1979 she sang the covers of several disco and hit songs in Hungary originally performed by Donna Summer, Barbra Streisand, Laura Branigan, Madonna, Tanita Tikaram, Sam Brown, Anastacia etc.

Besides singing, Kati Kovács also writes lyrics. One of her best known works which she also performed is the lyrics to Vangelis’ composition 1492: The Conquest of Paradise.

Since 23 October 2009 she works with the psychedelic soul-beat band The Qualitons. They had a very successful concert in Budapest with the singer's rare beat and funk songs. It is said to be Kati's big comeback. In 2010 they are on tour around the country. They were planning a new album together but their connection is lost.

Christina Aguilera's 2010 single "Woohoo" contains a sample from the song Add már, uram, az esőt!.

Awards

 Music Week Star of the Year Award (England) in 1974
 Liszt Prize in 1986
 Order of Merit of the Republic of Hungary – Knight's Cross in 1994
 Order of Merit of the Republic of Hungary – Officer's Cross in 2011
 Honorary Citizen of Budapest in 2011
 Kossuth Prize in 2014

Albums

See also
Hungarian pop

References

External links

1944 births
Living people
Women rock singers
20th-century Hungarian women singers
Hungarian pop singers
21st-century Hungarian women singers
German-language singers